Cneorane is a leaf beetle genus in the family Chrysomelidae.

Species list

References

External links

Galerucinae
Chrysomelidae genera
Taxa named by Joseph Sugar Baly